KXMD-TV (channel 11) is a television station in Williston, North Dakota, United States, affiliated with CBS and The CW Plus. Owned by Nexstar Media Group, the station maintains a news bureau and advertising sales office at the intersection of 13th Avenue West and 18th Street West (near US 2/85) in Williston, and its transmitter is located west of the city near the North Dakota–Montana border.

KXMD is part of the KX Television regional network of CBS affiliates in central and western North Dakota, originating from flagship station KXMB-TV (channel 12) in Bismarck. The KX network relays CBS network and other programming across central and western North Dakota, as well as bordering counties in Montana and South Dakota. Master control and some internal operations of KXMD are based at KXMB's facilities on North 15th Street in Bismarck. The four stations are counted as a single unit for ratings purposes.

KXMD operates as a semi-satellite of KXMC-TV (channel 13) in Minot. KXMC is itself a semi-satellite of KXMB-TV in Bismarck, which also has semi-satellite KXMA-DT2 (channel 2.2) in Dickinson. KXMD identifies itself as a station in its own right, but clears all network and syndicated programming as provided through KXMC. However, KXMD airs separate local commercial inserts and legal identifications. The Montana viewing portion of KXMD's coverage area is within the Mountain Time Zone, and the station's prime time schedule starts at 6 p.m. rather than the usual 7 p.m. for the time zone.

The over-the-air signal of KXMD reaches portions of the Canadian province of Saskatchewan. Most of the Montana portion of KXMD's viewing area also receives CBS from KXGN-TV in Glendive via a network of translators and cable television.

History
KXMD signed on in November 1969 as a semi-satellite of KXMC-TV in Minot. Previously, Williston viewers had to pick up CBS programming on cable from KOOK-TV in Billings, Montana (now KTVQ), although KUMV-TV had not been above breaking away from the KFYR/KMOT feed when CBS had something very important to present.

Boler sold his interest in the KX stations to Reiten in 1971. Steve Reiten, Dave Reiten, Kathleen Reiten Hruby, Tim Reiten, and Melanie Reiten Shonkwiler, Chester's children, still own the stations today (including KXMA-TV in Dickinson, which he bought in 1985).

The KX stations previously had a secondary affiliation with ABC before full-time ABC affiliate KMCY signed on in 1986. During the late 1950s, the stations were also briefly affiliated with the NTA Film Network.

Until 1986, KXMD was carried by cable systems across neighboring Saskatchewan, even operating a sales office in Saskatoon, as did KUMV and Great Falls ABC station KFBB-TV. These arrangements ended in 1986 when the Canadian cable companies were granted permission to replace the North Dakota signals with network affiliates from Detroit and Toledo, Ohio.

In 2006, the stations began a web portal-like website called KX Net, with each station's website displaying a localized front page. The stations continue to be branded as "KX Television" and as "KX News" on the air, but also use the "KX Net" moniker on the air also. KXNet.com combined the previous domains kxma.com, kxmb.com, kxmc.com and kxmd.com under one umbrella. The original domains are still active. KXNet.com won the 2007 Teddy Award for Best Website and the 2007 Eric Severaid Award for best website small market television in a 6 state region.

In October 2007, KXNet.com along with Midkota Solutions launched DakotaPolitics.com, a web site focusing on North Dakota political news coverage.  DakotaPolitics featured profile information, voting records and some analysis. DakotaPolitics also launched weekly tracking polls for the 2008 elections. In 2008 KXNet.com became the first web site in North Dakota to deliver a live news broadcast over the Internet when they streamed a 1-hour special coverage of the 2008 Presidential Caucuses from Bismarck.

In July 2008, Reiten Television began a joint agreement to sell television commercial slots on both its existing stations and KMCY, Minot's ABC affiliate owned by Forum Communications Company. KMCY became available in Williston on a full-power signal on KXMD's second digital subchannel in 2009.

Nexstar Broadcasting Group announced its $44 million purchase of the Reiten Television stations, including KXMA-TV, on September 17, 2015. Sale was completed on February 2, 2016. As result of the acquisition, Nexstar decided to terminate the Joint Sales Agreement with KMCY.

Programming
The KX network carries the CBS Overnight News (though with public service announcements instead of local commercials), while weekends simulcast the local weather conditions of North Dakota. All four stations provide a formal sign-off, including "The Star-Spangled Banner", at 1:05 a.m. CT/12:05 a.m. MT Tuesday through Saturday mornings and at 1:35 a.m. CT/12:35 a.m. MT on Sunday and Monday mornings.

The North Dakota State Fair parade in Minot is aired live across the KX network every July as well as a July 4th Parade in Mandan.

News operation
KXMC produces local newscasts daily at 6 a.m., noon, 6 p.m. and 10 p.m.  KXMC produces a morning show at 6 a.m., KX News Morning, and co-produces a 5 p.m. newscast with KXMB. Both are simulcast on all four stations. All of the local newscasts are broadcast in high definition.

For many years, KXMD placed inserts into KXMC's newscasts. However, recent cutbacks have resulted in KXMD's operations being largely merged with those of KXMC, and local inserts have been eliminated.

As a whole, KX Television has long trailed NBC North Dakota in the ratings by a significant margin; the main stations and their satellites are counted as one station for ratings and regulatory purposes. However, KXMC has historically been well ahead of KMOT in the ratings for the northern part of the market. This is largely because it is the only station airing a full schedule of local news for the northern part of the market. Also, KX News Morning has recently surged well ahead of NBC North Dakota's Country Morning Today—the first time in recent memory that NBC North Dakota has lost consecutive ratings periods in any time slot.

Technical information

Subchannels
The station's digital signal is multiplexed:

Analog-to-digital conversion
KXMD-TV shut down its analog signal, over VHF channel 11, on June 12, 2009, the official date in which full-power television stations in the United States transitioned from analog to digital broadcasts under federal mandate. The station's digital signal remained on its pre-transition UHF channel 14. Through the use of PSIP, digital television receivers display the station's virtual channel as its former VHF analog channel 11.

Translator

See also
KXMA-TV
KXMB-TV
KXMC-TV

References

External links

CBS network affiliates
Laff (TV network) affiliates
Ion Mystery affiliates
XMD-TV
Television channels and stations established in 1969
1969 establishments in North Dakota
Williston, North Dakota
The CW affiliates
Nexstar Media Group